The 1947–48 Colby Mules men's ice hockey season was the 22nd season of play for the program but first under the oversight of the NCAA. The Mules represented Colby College and were coached by Bill Millett, in his 15th season.

Season
Colby had a rather forgettable season. The team started out losing its first four games by wide margins. During those matches the team played well early on but a lack of reserve players caused the team to become fatigued while their opponents were able to utilize three, four or sometimes five different offensive line combinations. The Mules' first win came against a paltry Suffolk squad and saw the top line of Millett, Collins and Borah pot 6 goals, nearly doubling the team's totals themselves.

After earning their first conference win over MIT the team was riding a wave of optimism and played hard against Northeastern. The Mules jumped out to a 4–1 lead but, again due to a lack of depth, could only watch as the Huskies scored 6 goals in the final period to run away with the match. The final game against in-state rival Bowdoin followed a similar pattern with the Mules losing 4–7 once more.

Donald Choate served as team manager.

Roster

Standings

Schedule and results

|-
!colspan=12 style=";" | Regular Season

References

Colby Mules men's ice hockey seasons
Colby
Colby
Colby